Ritu Varma (born 10 March 1990) is an Indian actress who works in Telugu and Tamil films. After appearing in short films and supporting roles, Varma played the lead in the Telugu film Pelli Choopulu (2016) for which she received Nandi Award for Best Actress and Filmfare Critics Award for Best Actress – South.

Early life
Ritu Taran Varma was born and brought up in Hyderabad in a North Indian family. Her father is from Madhya Pradesh and she speaks Hindi at home. She is fluent in Telugu and does her own dubbing for her Telugu films.

She did her intermediate from Villa Marie College for Women, Hyderabad and holds a bachelor's degree in engineering from Malla Reddy Engineering College. After completing her graduation, she took part in the Miss Hyderabad Beauty pageant and was declared the first runner-up.

Career
Varma rose to fame with her performance in the Telugu short film Anukokunda. The short film won the Best Film award at the 48HR Film Project competition in 2012 and also fetched Varma the Best Actor (Female) award. The short film was later screened at the Cannes Short Film Corner in 2013.

Her first feature film was Baadshah where she played a supporting role named Pinky. She signed her next film as a lead Prema Ishq Kaadhal in which she played the role of a costume designer opposite Sree Vishnu. Sebsequently, she appeared in Naa Rakumarudu (2014), which was followed by Yevade Subramanyam, for which she was nominated for Best Supporting Actress (Female) award at IIFA Utsavam. Her next release, Pelli Choopulu, was a romantic-comedy Telugu film starring Vijay Deverakonda. The film went on to be commercially successful and won the Best Feature Film in Telugu at the 64th National Film Awards as well as the Filmfare Award for Best Film - Telugu. She received critical praise for her performance and eventually won the Nandi Award for Best Actress and Filmfare Critics Award for Best Actress - Telugu for her performance.

Her next release was Keshava along with Nikhil Siddharth. She did an advertisement for Amazon Pongal 2017 alongside Aari. Impressed with her performance in Pelli Choopulu, director Gautham Vasudev Menon chose her as the lead in his upcoming Tamil film with Vikram, Dhruva Natchathiram. She later played the leading role in Desingh Periyasamy's Tamil-language romantic film Kannum Kannum Kollaiyadithaal alongside Dulquer Salmaan (2020) which went on to be commercially successful and critically acclaimed. In 2019, she was signed to star opposite Nani in Tuck Jagadish, marking the second collaboration between the two actors. 

In 2021, Varma starred in Ninnila Ninnila alongside Ashok Selvan and Nithya Menen. It had a direct OTT release on ZEE5 and received positive reviews especially for Varma's portrayal. After Tuck Jagadish, which also had an OTT release on Amazon Prime Video, her last release of the year was Varudu Kaavalenu. 

In 2022, Ritu's first release was the anthology Modern Love Hyderabad in the segment "Fuzzy,Purple and full of Thorns" which streamed on Amazon Prime Video. Her next release was the bilingual Oke Oka Jeevitham /Kanam, followed by Nitham Oru Vaanam. 

In 2023, Ritu Varma is slated to star alongside Vishal in the film Mark Antony and her film Dhruva Natchathiram which has been long pending is said to be released this year

Filmography

Television

Awards and nominations

References

External links
 
 

Living people
Actresses from Hyderabad, India
Indian film actresses
Actresses in Telugu cinema
Actresses in Tamil cinema
21st-century Indian actresses
Female models from Hyderabad, India
Telugu actresses
1990 births
Nandi Award winners
Filmfare Awards South winners